Smedby AIS is a Swedish football club located in Norrköping.

Background
Smedby AIS (or SAIS for short) is a football club from southeast Norrköping based in the district of Smedby. The club was founded on 3 October 1929 and played in the third tier of Swedish football for the first time in 1961 and again in 1967–70, 1978, 1980–81 and 2003.

Since their foundation Smedby AIS has participated mainly in the lower divisions of the Swedish football league system.  The club currently plays in Division 3 Nordöstra Götaland which is the fifth tier of Swedish football. They play their home matches at the Mirum Arena in Norrköping.

Smedby AIS are affiliated to the Östergötlands Fotbollförbund.  With an active youth section the club has over 1,500 members and has produced players like Hasan Cetinkaya, Niclas Fredriksson, Linus Hellman and Christos Christoforidis.

Season to season

Current squad

Attendances

In recent seasons Smedby AIS have had the following average attendances:

Footnotes

External links
 Smedby AIS – Official Website

Sport in Norrköping
Football clubs in Östergötland County
Association football clubs established in 1929
1929 establishments in Sweden